The Geostationary Defense and Strategic Communications Satellite or SGDC (in Portuguese: Satélite Geoestacionário de Defesa e Comunicações Estratégicas) is a Brazilian geostationary communication satellite that was built by Thales Alenia Space in France, it was placed in the orbital position of 75 degrees west longitude and will be operated by Telebrás. Telebrás selected Viasat as a partner to help build the associated ground system. The satellite was based on the Spacebus-4000 platform and its life expectancy will be 18 years.

The satellite was successfully launched into space on May 4, 2017, at 21:52 UTC, by means of an Ariane 5 vehicle from the French company Arianespace, launched from Guiana Space Centre, Kourou, French Guiana, together with the Koreasat 7. It had a launch mass of 12,800 pounds (5,800 kg). The SGDC will be equipped with 50 Ka band transponders and 5 X band transponders to provide broadband internet and communications to the Brazilian government and the Brazilian Armed Forces.

A backup satellite, SGDC-2, was initially planned for launch no earlier than 2022. As of July 2021, the procurement of this satellite has been delayed indefinitely due to concerns over cost and the legality of the procurement agreement.

See also

 China-Brazil Earth Resources Satellite
 Brazilian Space Agency

References

2017 in Brazil
Spacecraft launched in 2017
May 2017 events in South America
Communications satellites of Brazil